The Belcher-Rowe House is a historic house at 26 Governor Belcher Lane in Milton, Massachusetts.  The two-story hip-roofed wood-frame house was built in 1776 by Elizabeth Teale Belcher and Maria Louisa Emilia Teale, step-daughter and widow of the late Governor of Massachusetts Jonathan Belcher.  It was the first Federal style house to be built in Milton.  Elizabeth Belcher sold the house to John Rowe in 1781, and it remained in the Rowe family until 1940.

The house was listed on the National Register of Historic Places in 1982.

See also
National Register of Historic Places listings in Milton, Massachusetts

References

Federal architecture in Massachusetts
Houses completed in 1776
Houses in Norfolk County, Massachusetts
National Register of Historic Places in Milton, Massachusetts
Milton, Massachusetts
Houses on the National Register of Historic Places in Norfolk County, Massachusetts